Agency Houses in British India, were trading companies that arose in 17th and 18th century India during the Company rule in India.

History

Background 

In the 17th and 18th century, most of Eastern India came under the rule of the East India Company. India, then, was a major producer of spices and dyes, primarily Indigo. The trade of Indigo was a major business. The agency houses were initially formed to trade in commodities, primarily Indigo. The agency houses were also involved in all the financial dealings that arose from the export of these commodities to Europe.

Business 

Before the advent of joint-stock banking companies in India, the role of banks was played by agency houses. The agency houses performed various quasi-banking functions which included but were not limited to:

 Accepting deposits (agency houses accepted deposits only from British nationals and other Europeans)
 Financing trade
 Lending of money (primarily to the Government)

Downfall 

In the 19th century, synthetic Indigo had been invented by Adolf von Baeyer at the German company BASF. This gradually reduced the demand for natural Indigo sourced from India. As a result, the agency houses of British India gradually faded away and were replaced by new conglomerates and trading companies.

Legacy 

The agency houses played a major role in shaping the economy of colonial India.

Several early banks in India, such as the Bank of Hindostan, were founded by these Agency Houses.

They also invented the Tinkathia System, which was a major point of contention during the Indian independence movement.

List of notable Agency Houses 

The Agency Houses of British India include:
 Alexander and Company - They founded the very first bank in India, the Bank of Hindostan
 Palmer and Company - Founded by officials of the East India Company and one of the wealthiest agency houses 
 Fergusson and Company
 Mackintosh and Company
 Cruttenden and Company

See also

 Banking in India
 Economy of India under Company rule
 Company rule in India

References

External Links
 History of Agency Houses

Economic history of India
Trading companies of the United Kingdom